This article lists census-designated places (CDPs) in the U.S. state of Montana. As of 2018, there were a total of 235 census-designated places in Montana.

Census-Designated Places

References

See also
List of cities and towns in Montana
List of counties in Montana

 
Census-designated places
Montana